Rubtsovo is a rural locality (a settlement) in Leskovskoye Rural Settlement, Vologodsky District, Vologda Oblast, Russia. The population was 228 as of 2002. There are 3 streets.

Geography 
Rubtsovo is located 8 km west of Vologda (the district's administrative centre) by road. Vatlanovo is the nearest rural locality.

References 

Rural localities in Vologodsky District